Archibald Hunter Arrington (November 13, 1809 – July 20, 1872) was a slave owner,  U.S. Congressman from North Carolina from 1841 to 1845 and a member of the Confederate Congress during the American Civil War.

Born near Nashville, North Carolina in 1809, Arrington attended a local academy in Hilliardston and then Louisburg College. Although he studied law, he was also a significant landowner and slave owner.

In 1840, Arrington was elected as a Democrat to the U.S. House; he served for two terms, in the 27th and 28th Congresses. (March 4, 1841 – March 3, 1845) He sought re-election in 1844, but was defeated and failed to gain a third term.

Arrington was a supporter of the Confederacy during the Civil War—he was a member of North Carolina's secession convention in 1861 and was a member of the First Confederate Congress, although he was defeated for re-election in 1863.

After the Civil War, Arrington was a delegate to the Union National Convention at Philadelphia in 1866, the chairman of the court of common pleas and quarter sessions for Nash County in 1866 and 1867 and a county commissioner in 1868. After departing politics, he engaged in the management of his estate and died on his plantation in 1872, where he is buried in a family graveyard.

References

1809 births
1872 deaths
People from Nashville, North Carolina
County commissioners in North Carolina
Louisburg College alumni
Members of the Confederate House of Representatives from North Carolina
American slave owners
Democratic Party members of the United States House of Representatives from North Carolina
19th-century American politicians